Venezuela competed in the 2019 Pan American Games in Lima, Peru from July 26 to August 11, 2019.

The Venezuelan delegation consisted of 282 athletes (153 men and 129 women).

Competitors
The following is the list of number of competitors (per gender) participating at the games per sport/discipline.

Medalists

The following Venezuelan competitors won medals at the games. In the by discipline sections below, medalists' names are bolded. 

|  style="text-align:left; width:78%; vertical-align:top;"|

|  style="text-align:left; width:26%; vertical-align:top;"|

Archery

Venezuela qualified a team of three archers through the 2018 Pan American Archery Championships.

Men

Women

Mixed

Athletics

Venezuelan athletics participates in the Pan American Games in Lima 2019, after the Association of Panamerican Athletics (APA) confirmed 23 places for the criollos.
Ten women and 13 men are included in the product list by the APA, then meet the minimum marks set by the Technical Committee and enter the quotas assigned for each test. Yulimar Rojas, who will be presented in Lima as a member of Team PanamSports.

Men
Track & road events

Key: Q=Qualified for next round based on position in heat; q=Qualified for next round as fastest loser; *=Athlete ran in a preliminary round but not the final

Field events

Key: Q=Qualify for final based on position in group; q=Qualify for final based on position in field without meeting qualifying mark

Combined event – Decathlon

Women
Track & road events

Key: Q=Qualified for next round based on position in heat; q=Qualified for next round as fastest loser; *=Athlete ran in a preliminary round but not the final

Field events

Key: Q=Qualify for final based on position in group; q=Qualify for final based on position in field without meeting qualifying mark

Combined event – Heptathlon

Badminton

Venezuela qualified a team of two badminton athletes (one per gender).

Basketball 

Venezuela qualified a team of 4 athletes for the 3x3 competition by virtue of being in the top 5 of the FIBA Ranking of November 2018.

5 × 5
Summary

Men's tournament

Preliminary round

Fifth place match

3 × 3
Summary

Men's tournament

Preliminary round

Fifth place match

Women's tournament

Preliminary round

Fifth place match

Basque pelota

Venezuela is scheduled to compete in basque pelota.

Men

Women

Beach volleyball

Venezuela qualified a men's pair.

Men

Bodybuilding

Venezuela qualified a full team of two bodybuilders (one male and one female).

Bowling

Venezuela qualified two men and two women by virtue of being in the top 4 of the 2018 South American Games.

Boxing

Venezuela qualified six boxers (four men and two women).

Men

Women

Canoeing

Slalom
Venezuela qualified a total of fourth slalom athletes (two men and two women).

Sprint
Venezuela qualified a total of 6 sprint athletes (two men and four women).

Men

Women

Qualification legend: QF – Qualify to final; SF – Qualify to semifinal

Cycling

Venezuelan cyclists qualified for the following events

Track
Sprint

Keirin

Omnium

Madison

Road

BMX
Venezuela qualified two athlete for BMX Racing and two athletes for BMX Freestyle by virtue of being in the top 22 of the 2018 UCI BMX Men's Ranking and top 6 of the UCI BMX Freestyle Men's and Women's Ranking.

Mountain biking
Venezuela qualified one athlete by virtue of being in the top 16 of the 2018 Mountain Bike Pan American Continental Championships.

Diving 
 
Venezuelan divers qualified for two individual and one team spots by virtue of a top 3 finish respectively at the 2018 CONSANAT Championships .

Men

Women

Equestrian

Venezuelan equestrians qualified teams in Jumping competition and have also qualified one athlete in the individual dressage competition.

Dressage

Jumping

Fencing

Venezuela qualified a team of 14 fencers (seven men and seven women).

Men

Women

Golf

Venezuela qualified a full team of four golfers (two men and two women).

Gymnastics

Venezuelas qualified a male team by virtue of being Top 8 the 2018 Pan American Gymnastics Championships and one female athlete for individual all around top 7 countries not already qualified, in the 2018 Pan American Gymnastics Championships.

Artistic
Men
Team final and individual qualification

Individual finals

Women
Individual qualification

Individual finals

Rhythmic
Individual

Group

Trampoline

Judo

Venezuela qualified 13 judokas (six men and seven women).

Men

Women

Karate

Venezuela qualified a team of ten karatekas (five men and five women).

Kumite (sparring)

Kata (forms)

Modern pentathlon

Venezuela qualified two male modern pentathletes.

Men

Racquetball

Venezuela qualified two female racquetball athletes.

Women

Roller sports

Speed

Rowing

Venezuela qualified 2 boats, for a total of 3 rowers, at the 2018 Pan American Qualification Regatta.

Men

Sailing

Venezuela has qualified 5 boats for a total of 6 sailors.

Men

Women

Mixed

Shooting

Venezuela qualified 5 athletes through the 2018 Shooting Championships of the Americas.

Men

Softball

Venezuela qualified a women's team (of 15 athletes) by being ranked in the top five nations at the 2017 Women's Pan American Championships. The men's team (also consisting of 15 athletes) qualified later by winning the 2017 Men's Pan American Championships.

Summary

Men's tournament

Preliminary round

Women's tournament

Preliminary round

Surfing

Venezuela qualified six surfers (three men and three women) in the sport's debut at the Pan American Games.

Artistic

Race

Swimming

Venezuela will send 21 athletes to the 2019 Pan American Games, the Technical Committee of the American Swimming Union (UANA) completed the selection of athletes for swimming events at the Pan American Games Lima 2019.

Venezuelan swimmers have so far achieved qualifying for Open water swimming obtain the first eight places (per gender) in the qualification competition in Campeonato Sudamericano de Deportes Acuáticos 2018.

Men

Women

Mixed

 Legend: (*) = Swimmers who participated in the heat only.

Table tennis

Men

Women

Mixed

Taekwondo

Kyorugi (sparring)
Men

Women

Triathlon

Venezuela qualified an athlete.
Women

Water polo 
 
Venezuela women's water polo team qualified for the Games, after reaching the final in the Women's tournament at the 2018 CONSANAT South American  Championships in Trujillo, Perú.

Summary
Key:
 FT – After full time.
 P – Match decided by penalty-shootout.

Summary

Weightlifting

Venezuela qualified ten weightlifters (six men and four women).

Men

Women

Wrestling

Men's freestyle

Key: VT=Victory by fall; VF=Victory by forfeit; ST=Victory by great superiority; SP=Victory by technical superiority; PP=Victory by points, loser with technical points; PO=Victory by points, loser without technical points

Men's Greco-Roman

Key: VT=Victory by fall; VF=Victory by forfeit; ST=Victory by great superiority; SP=Victory by technical superiority; PP=Victory by points, loser with technical points; PO=Victory by points, loser without technical points

Women's freestyle

Key: VT=Victory by fall; VB=Victory by injury; ST=Victory by great superiority; SP=Victory by technical superiority; PP=Victory by points, loser with technical points; PO=Victory by points, loser without technical points

References

Nations at the 2019 Pan American Games
Pan American Games
2019